Miika is a Finnish male given name.

Famous people with the name include:

 Miika Elomo (born 1977), Finnish ice hockey player
 Miika Koppinen (born 1978), Finnish football defender
 Miika Tenkula (1974–2009), Finnish heavy metal musician
 Miika Wiikman (born 1984), Finnish ice hockey goaltender
 Miika Koivisto (born 1990), Finnish ice hockey player

Finnish masculine given names